The Wikianji (Wik Iyanh) were an indigenous Australian tribe of the Cape York Peninsula of northern Queensland.

Country
Their territory embraced an area of some  around the middle section of the Holroyd River.

Social structure
The Wikianji were a relatively small tribe, believed to be related to the Wik-Mungkan from whom they may have at the time of early colonial exploration just splintered off, and in the process of becoming a separate tribe.

Alternative names
 Wikianyi
 Wik-Iyena.

Notes

Citations

Sources

Aboriginal peoples of Queensland